Louis Vincent Anthony Nanne (born June 2, 1941) is a Canadian-born American former National Hockey League defenceman and general manager. He played in the National Hockey League with the Minnesota North Stars between 1968 and 1978 and then served as the general manager of the team from 1978 to 1988. He also coached the team briefly during the 1978–79 season. Internationally Nanne played for the American national team at the 1968 Winter Olympics and the 1976 and 1977 World Championships, as well as 1976 Canada Cup, and managed the American teams at the 1981, 1984, and 1987 Canada Cup. He is a member of the United States Hockey Hall of Fame and of the International Ice Hockey Federation Hall of Fame.

Early life
Nanne grew up in Ontario where he played hockey with Phil and Tony Esposito. In 1960, he enrolled at the University of Minnesota to play hockey for the Minnesota Gophers while studying business administration. At Minnesota, he would be coached by the legendary John Mariucci and would become one of the biggest stars in American college hockey during the 1960s. He is still the only defenseman to win the league scoring title which he accomplished in the 1962–63 season. In 1967, Nanne became an American citizen which allowed him to play for and captain the U.S. national team, alongside future Miracle on Ice coach Herb Brooks, which finished 6th at the 1968 Winter Olympics in Grenoble, France.

Playing career
Lou Nanne turned down a $8000 contract offer from the National Hockey League's Chicago Blackhawks in 1963 after graduating from university, noting that he made three times as much money in his current job working as a salesman for Harvey Mackay's envelope manufacturing company. Nanne finally started his National Hockey League career in 1968 following the Olympics. He would spend his entire career in Minnesota after signing a free agent contract with the expansion Minnesota North Stars who had acquired his rights from the Blackhawks. He played 635 NHL regular season games for the North Stars through the 1977–78 season. A steady defenseman and sometime forward, he scored 21 goals in 1971–72, but was mostly known for his defensive, penalty killing abilities. Nanne played for American national team in 1976 and 1977, and the inaugural 1976 Canada Cup. Nanne also served as national team captain or alternate in both years.

Nanne also played minor pro league hockey for the Rochester Mustangs and Cleveland Barons.

Post-playing career
After retiring Nanne became the general manager and coach of the North Stars. With an infusion of notable players from the merger with the Cleveland Barons and through the draft, Nanne quickly rebuilt the North Stars into a contender after his playing career ended in 1978. The Stars reached the Stanley Cup Finals in 1981, the conference final in 1984, and made the playoffs seven consecutive seasons (1979–1986). This winning run saw the North Stars average over 35 wins per season, encompassed the North Stars sole 40-win season, and six of the organization's ten 35-plus-win seasons. In 1988, after two seasons in which the North Stars finished below .500 and had consecutive fifth-place finishes in the Norris Division, Nanne resigned from the North Stars citing health reasons. Nanne also served as general manager of the U.S. national team in the 1981, 1984 and 1987 Canada Cup tournaments.

In 1980, CBS enlisted the services of Nanne to provide color commentary of their telecast of Game 6 of the Stanley Cup Finals between the Philadelphia Flyers and New York Islanders. Nanne worked alongside play-by-play men Dan Kelly (who called the first and third periods as well as overtime) and Tim Ryan (who called the second period).

Influence on the "Miracle on Ice"
Nanne, along with USA Hockey's Walter Bush, spearheaded the campaign to have Brooks named head coach of the U.S. Olympic Hockey Team leading up to the 1980 Winter Games. Nanne, who had just been named the General Manager of the North Stars, offered Brooks the North Stars' head coaching job, but Brooks declined, saying that it was instead his goal to coach the Olympic team. After legendary Boston University coach Jack Parker turned down the head coach position of Team USA, Nanne and Bush became involved in the Olympic Team selection process and pushed for Brooks to be named coach. Brooks did later coach under Nanne in Minnesota during the 1987–88 season, but was fired following a 19–48–13 season.

Personal life
Nanne has been the TV color commentator for the Minnesota State High School Boys Hockey tournament since 1964, a total of 58 years. His son, Marty Nanne (born October 16, 1967), was selected by the Chicago Blackhawks in the eighth round of the 1986 NHL Entry Draft. Nanne has three grandsons playing junior ice hockey or high school hockey. One, also named Lou, played for Edina High School before passing up his senior season to play for the Penticton Vees. He had signed to play hockey for the University of Minnesota, but decommitted and instead attended Rensselaer Polytechnic Institute. He was drafted by the Minnesota Wild in 2012, but never played professionally. Tyler Nanne, who was drafted by the New York Rangers in the 2014 NHL Entry Draft, was a member of the Edina High School team that won consecutive Minnesota State High School Hockey Tournaments in 2013 and 2014. He played at Ohio St for 1 year, then transferred to the University of Minnesota. Nanne's granddaughter Erin works for the Minnesota Wild. Their cousin Vinni Lettieri, whose father Tino, was a goalie for the 1986 Canadian World Cup soccer team, played for Minnetonka High School before joining the Lincoln Stars and is now a member of the Anaheim Ducks of the National Hockey League. Nanne opened "Lou Nanne's Steakhouse" in Edina, Minnesota in March 2016. It has since been renamed Tavern23 as a tribute to Nanne's jersey number.

Career statistics

Regular season and playoffs

International

Coaching record

Awards and honors

 WCHA Most Valuable Player (1963)
 Lester Patrick Trophy (1989)
 International Ice Hockey Federation Hall of Fame
 United States Hockey Hall of Fame

References

External links
 
 Gopher Hockey History Player Info

 

1941 births
Living people
AHCA Division I men's ice hockey All-Americans
American ice hockey coaches
American men's ice hockey defensemen
Canadian emigrants to the United States
Ice hockey people from Ontario
Ice hockey players at the 1968 Winter Olympics
IIHF Hall of Fame inductees
Lester Patrick Trophy recipients
Minnesota Golden Gophers men's ice hockey players
Minnesota North Stars coaches
Minnesota North Stars executives
Minnesota North Stars players
Olympic ice hockey players of the United States
Sportspeople from Sault Ste. Marie, Ontario
United States Hockey Hall of Fame inductees